Gurdigol-e Nur ed Din (also Romanized as Gūrdīgol-e Nūr ed Dīn) is a village in Qeshlaq-e Sharqi Rural District, Qeshlaq Dasht District, Bileh Savar County, Ardabil Province, Iran. At the 2006 census, its population was 112, in 21 families.

References 

Towns and villages in Bileh Savar County